In computability theory, Bekić's theorem or Bekić's lemma is a theorem about fixed-points which allows splitting a mutual recursion into recursions on one variable at a time. It was created by Austrian Hans Bekić (1936-1982) in 1969, and published posthumously in a book by Cliff Jones in 1984.

The theorem is set up as follows. Then define the operator . This is monotone with respect to the product order (componentwise order).

Proof (Bekić):
 since it is the fixed point. Similarly .

Variants 

It can instead be defined in a symmetric presentation:

Usage 

Bekić's theorem can be applied repeatedly to find the least fixed point of a tuple in terms of least fixed points of single variables. Although the resulting expression might become rather complex, it can be easier to reason about fixed points of single variables when designing an automated theorem prover.

References 

Order theory
Fixed-point theorems